Devastation of Musculation is the eighth album by Canadian heavy metal band Thor, released in 2006 on Smog Veil Records. It features new guitarist, Mike Kischnick (Empyria, Severed Serenity), who also co-wrote and co-produced the record with singer Jon Mikl Thor. Three music videos were produced to help promote the album, for the tracks "Release The Beast", "Devastation Of Musculation", and "Lords of Steel" The video for the first being included as a bonus on the CD.  
Prior to its release, Jon Mikl Thor explained in a promo that:

Critical Reception
Reviews of the album have been mixed to good. One reviewer of Piercing Metal gave a good rating, stating how "Musically this is a very fun album as well, and with songs like “Lies Of Eternity”, “Cold White Ghost” and “Union Of Power” he shows that there is a solid level of musical strength to work with his lyrics and subject matter. Thor also delivers a ballad on the album in “Abandon”, which is this recording's version of “Turn To Blue” (one of the best songs off “Thor Against The World”). If you can take this CD as what it is supposed to do and that is entertain I think it’s a winner and in a world that so sorely needs heroes today, isn’t it nice to know that Thor walks among us?"

Ear Candy Mag called it "Slightly redeeming", with a reviewer saying how while the music isn’t exactly exciting, "songs like “The Return of Odin’s Son” should make the sword-wielding, Odin-worshipping crowd fairly happy. Basically, Thor’s latest release is a cheesy, bang your head as a guilty pleasure kind of disc that is as campy yet compelling as a Troma film or reality television, as songs like “Queen of The Damned” and the surprisingly tender “Don’t Abandon Me” deliciously demonstrates the fun side of heavy metal without a net."

Track listing

Personnel 

Thor
 Jon Mikl Thor – lead vocals
 Mike Kischnick – lead & rhythm guitars, keyboards, multi-instruments, backing vocals
 Ogron – bass
 Panthar – drums

Additional personnel
 John Buck – backing vocals
 Steve Bifford – backing vocals
 Kent Kynaston – drums

Production
 Jon Mikl Thor - producer
 Mike Kischnick - engineering, mixing, producer
 Craig Waddell - mastering

References

External links
Devastation of Musculation album at Discogs.com

Thor (band) albums
2006 albums
Smog Veil Records albums